"Ain't Nothing" is a hip hop song by American rapper Juicy J, released on February 3, 2017 as the second official single from his fourth solo studio album Rubba Band Business (2017). The song features guest appearances from fellow artists Wiz Khalifa and Ty Dolla Sign.

Music video
The official music video was released February 6, 2017.

Charts

References

2017 singles
2017 songs
Juicy J songs
Ty Dolla Sign songs
Wiz Khalifa songs
Columbia Records singles
Songs written by Juicy J
Songs written by Ty Dolla Sign
Songs written by Wiz Khalifa
Song recordings produced by Mike Will Made It
Songs written by Mike Will Made It
Songs written by Slim Jxmmi